Aryeh Eldad, M.D. (born 1 May 1950) is an Israeli physician, politician and former medical officer. 

Eldad is a professor of medicine, and was head of the plastic surgery and burns unit at the Hadassah Medical Center. He was a member of the Knesset from 2003 to 2013 for the National Union and from 2012 for Otzma LeYisrael, which he co-founded. He was formerly a chief medical officer, and was the senior commander of the Israeli Defense Forces medical corps for 25 years.

Biography
Eldad was born in Tel Aviv in 1950. As a child, he was a voice actor in radio plays for Israeli state radio. He is married, with five children. His father, Israel Eldad, was a well-known Israeli public thinker, and formerly one of the leaders of the militant underground group Lehi. Aryeh Eldad is a resident of the Israeli settlement of Kfar Adumim, and is a Brigadier-General (reserves) in the Israel Defense Forces.

Medical career 
Eldad studied medicine at Tel Aviv University, where he earned his doctorate. He served as the chief medical officer, and was the senior commander of the Israeli Defense Forces medical corps for 25 years, and reached a rank of Tat Aluf (Brigadier General). He is renowned worldwide for his treatment of burns, and won the Evans Award from the American Burns Treatment Association. Eldad is a professor of medicine, and was head of the plastic surgery and burns unit at the Hadassah Medical Center hospital in Jerusalem.

Political career
Eldad was first elected to the Knesset on the National Union list in 2003, and chaired the Ethics Committee. Prior to the scheduled Israeli withdrawal from the Gaza Strip and the northern West Bank in August 2005, Eldad was the only member of parliament to call for non-violent civil disobedience as a tactic in the struggle against the government. Eldad even walked the few hundred kilometres between the now-evacuated community of Sa-Nur (in the northern West Bank) to Neve Dekalim (south Gaza Strip), in order to attract attention to the opposition of the Withdrawal plan.

In the February 2006 dismantlement of the Amona outpost, Eldad was injured during the confrontation between demonstrators and police, as was his ally MK Effi Eitam. The event caused a storm of criticism on both sides, as interim Prime Minister Ehud Olmert accused them of inciting the crowd to attack the police, while they accused Olmert and the police of reckless use of force.

After being re-elected in 2006, in August 2007, Eldad established and headed a 10-member Homesh Knesset caucus met for the first time. The caucus' mandate is to work to promote the re-establishment of Homesh - with the aim of eventually re-establishing all the settlements dismantled in 2005. 

In October 2007 he took part in the international counter-jihad conference in Brussels. He organised a counter-jihad conference  himself titled "Facing Jihad" in Jerusalem the following year that included a screening of the film Fitna by Geert Wilders.

In November 2007, he announced the formation of a new secular right-wing party named Hatikva. Ultimately, the party ran as a faction of the National Union in the 2009 elections, with Eldad in third place on the alliance's list. He retained his seat as the Union won four mandates.

In 2008, after Meretz Chairman Yossi Beilin submitted a bill to remove the Jewish settlers from Hebron, Eldad called the proposal "racist". In protest, he submitted a "mirror image" bill to the Knesset proposing that Hebron's Arab residents be removed "in order to protect the Jews of Hebron". Neither bill was adopted.

Eldad's 2009 proposal that Palestinian Arabs be given Jordanian citizenship drew a formal protest from the Jordanian foreign minister.

In 2012, Eldad and Michael Ben-Ari launched a new party, Otzma LeYisrael. However, the party failed to cross the 2% threshold in the 2013 elections, and Eldad subsequently lost his Knesset seat.

Political beliefs
Eldad supports the right of Jews to live in any part of the Land of Israel, and opposes any surrender of Israeli sovereignty to the PLO. Eldad opposes the creation of any Palestinian Arab state west of the Jordan River, and called its possibility a "disaster". The creation of a Palestinian state in the West Bank would lead, Eldad believes, to a Hamas-run center of terror within three days of Israeli transfer of the land. Furthermore, Eldad believes that the State of Israel will never have peace with the Arabs.

On his Zionism, Eldad stated that "I belong to this part of the Jewish people that believes the Land of Israel belongs to the People of Israel". In a university lecture, he questioned, "How did we [the Jewish people] become so distorted as to say the Arabs have a right to our land?" On "occupation", he posits that "the only occupation I know of is the Arab occupation of the Land of Israel in the seventh century... If I am an occupier in Hebron, I am an occupier in Tel Aviv..." The Balfour Declaration, the White Papers, the United Nations recognition of the State of Israel - all these, Eldad believes, are not the sources of the Jewish right to the Land of Israel, but "only recognition of our right".

On his political goals, Eldad has stated: "When I wake up in the morning, I divide the day into two parts. In the first part of the day, I try to prevent the creation of a Palestinian state. It is not a full-time job; so, in the second part of the day, I try to prevent corruption."

In March 2010, in response to David Miliband's statement that the Israeli cloning of British passports is "intolerable", he commented: "I think the British are being hypocritical, and I do not wish to insult dogs here, since some dogs show true loyalty, [but] who gave the British the right to judge us on the war on terror?".
The canine theme was taken up by a second MP, Michael Ben-Ari, who said: "Dogs are usually loyal, the British may be dogs, but they are not loyal to us. They seem to be loyal to the anti-Semitic establishment." He returned to a canine theme in 2017, analogizing Israelis who move to Germany to dog vomit.

During Mahmoud Ahmadinejad's visit to Lebanon in October 2010, Eldad stated:
"History would have been different if in 1939, some Jewish soldier had succeeded in taking Hitler out. If Ahmadinejad can be in the crosshairs of an IDF rifle when he comes to throw rocks at us, he must not return home alive."

Aryeh Eldad supports legalizing the medical use of cannabis in Israel, and has sponsored legislation to that effect.

References

External links
Arieh Eldad website
Aryeh Eldad Moledet website 

Civil Disobedience - in the Context of the Current Policies of the Governernment of Israel Israel Resource Review, 2 May 2005
Arieh Eldad News and Updates

1950 births
Living people
People from Tel Aviv
Tel Aviv University alumni
Israeli settlers
Israeli plastic surgeons
Israeli military doctors
Jewish physicians
Israeli Jews
Neo-Zionism
Israeli opinion journalists
National Union (Israel) politicians
Academic staff of Tel Aviv University
Counter-jihad activists
Members of the 16th Knesset (2003–2006)
Members of the 17th Knesset (2006–2009)
Members of the 18th Knesset (2009–2013)